"The bends" is a colloquialism for decompression sickness.

The Bends may also refer to:
 The Bends (album), a 1995 studio album by Radiohead
 "The Bends" (song), a 1995 song by Radiohead
 "The Bends", a song by Mr. Bungle from the 1995 album Disco Volante
 "The Bends", a song by Earl Sweatshirt from the 2018 album Some Rap Songs

See also
 Bends (film), a 2013 British film
 
 Bend (disambiguation)
 Bending (disambiguation)